Life Was Better is the second extended play release by Australian rock band Magic Dirt. It was released in November 1994 on the Melbourne independent label Au Go Go Records. The EP originally peaked at number 71 on the Australian singles chart, selling over 20,000 copies.

At the ARIA Music Awards of 1995, the EP was nominated for four awards; Best New Talent, Best Independent Release, Breakthrough Artist – Single and Best Alternative Release.

In 2020, the EP was re-released on CD and vinyl and it entered the Australian albums chart at number 26.

Background and release
After the release of their debut Signs of Satanic Youth in 1993, and a heady succession of touring with the likes of Sonic Youth, Smashing Pumpkins, Beck and Jon Spencer Blues Explosion, Magic Dirt weathered the hysteria of 'the next big thing' tag and a storm of major label interest by breaking up and getting back together four times. After regrouping for good and hiring help in the way of management and an agent, Magic Dirt reconvened in the middle of 1994 to record Life Was Better.

The cover art for Life Was Better was heavily influenced by Aussie cult movie Puberty Blues, with which the band were obsessed.

Follow its release, the band featured heavily on alternative press and garnered the band a national spot on the Big Day Out, supported Hole, Silverchair and Dinosaur Jr throughout 1995. Late in 1995, they signed a record deal in the USA.

Reception
In November 1994, OTS said "Geelong's favourite sons (and daughter) do it again, with five tracks of pure alterno magic... this is a guaranteed indie hit and one of the archetypal Australian releases of the year." In December 1994, D.D. Forte called the EP "the kind of feedback-laced gutter pop to knock the loneliness out of your head". In January 1995, Tracey Grimson from OTS said "It's clear that Magic Dirt take their lessons from a combination of the punk of new indie mixed with the roots of older alternative rock... What rises up is hard, heavy, contagious rock 'n' roll – a new breed." In December 1995, Nazz from Rip It Up said "It sounds like something sweet, like The Bangles... as covered by an air conditioner and a cement mixer".

In 2020, Jeff Jenkins from Stack Magazine said Life Was Better "...shows a band that should have conquered the world. Adalita Srsen sits comfortably alongside Chrissy Amphlett as a rock goddess.".

CD track listing

Personnel
Adalita Srsen – vocals, guitar
Dean Turner – bass
Adam Robertson – drums
Daniel Herring – guitar

Charts

Release history

References

1994 EPs
Magic Dirt albums
Au Go Go Records EPs
Indie pop EPs
EPs by Australian artists